Gordon Eugene "Gordy" Christian (November 21, 1927 – June 2, 2017) was an American ice hockey player. He played with the University of North Dakota from 1947 to 1950, tying for scoring leader on the team in both the 1947–48 and 1948–49 seasons. He was a member of the silver medal winning 1956 United States Olympic ice hockey team. He was born in Warroad, Minnesota.

Personal life
Christian comes from a hockey playing family. His brothers were 1960 hockey gold medalists Bill Christian and Roger Christian and his nephew was 1980 gold medalist Dave Christian.

See also
List of Olympic medalist families

References

 

1927 births
2017 deaths
People from Warroad, Minnesota
American men's ice hockey players
Ice hockey players from Minnesota
Ice hockey players at the 1956 Winter Olympics
North Dakota Fighting Hawks men's ice hockey players
Olympic silver medalists for the United States in ice hockey
Medalists at the 1956 Winter Olympics